Philco was an Italian professional cycling team that existed from 1960 to 1962.

References

External links

Cycling teams based in Italy
Defunct cycling teams based in Italy
1960 establishments in Italy
1962 disestablishments in Italy
Cycling teams established in 1960
Cycling teams disestablished in 1962